Flush may refer to:

Places
 Flush, Kansas, a community in the United States

Architecture, construction and manufacturing 
 Flush cut, a type of cut made with a French flush-cut saw or diagonal pliers
 Flush deck, in naval architecture
 Flush door
 Flush hem (hemming and seaming), in metal forming
 Flush hole, a countersink
 Flush rivet, countersunk rivets

Art, entertainment, and media
 Flush (cards), a hand in card games
 Flush (poker), a type of poker hand
See also: Royal flush
 Flush (slalom skiing), a consecutive series of vertical gates
 Flush (novel), a young adult novel by Carl Hiaasen
 Flush: A Biography, an imaginative fictional biography of Elizabeth Barrett Browning's dog, by Virginia Woolf
 "Flush" (Mötley Crüe song), 1997
 "Flush" (Brian Welch song), 2008
 Flush (film), a 1977 American comedy film

Biology, botany, and healthcare
 Flush (physiology), to become markedly red in the face and often other areas of the skin, from various physiological conditions
 Flush, a growth of leaves on the tea plant
 Harris flush, an enema type
 Saline flush
 Seep (hydrology), a seepage or flush of water from low-lying ground

Computing 
 Allocate-on-flush, a computer file system
 Cache flush, when a CPU cache is emptied

Other uses
 First flush, the initial surface runoff of a rainstorm
 Flush text, in justification
 Flush toilet, a toilet using water to dispose of waste, the operation of which is called a "flush"

See also 
 
 
 Flushing (disambiguation)
 Royal flush (disambiguation)